Drew Allison Carey (born May 23, 1958) is an American comedian, actor, and game show host. After serving in the U.S. Marine Corps and making a name for himself in stand-up comedy, Carey gained stardom in his own sitcom, The Drew Carey Show, and as host of the U.S. version of the improv comedy show Whose Line Is It Anyway?, both of which aired on ABC. He then appeared in several films, television series, music videos, a made-for-television film, and a computer game. Carey has hosted the game show The Price Is Right since October 15, 2007, on CBS.

Carey is interested in a variety of sports and has worked as a photographer at U.S. National Team soccer games. He is a minority owner of the Major League Soccer team Seattle Sounders FC, which won the MLS Cup, first in 2016 and again in 2019. Carey briefly participated in professional wrestling, entering the 2001 Royal Rumble, and was inducted into the WWE Hall of Fame in 2011.

Carey's autobiography, Dirty Jokes and Beer: Stories of the Unrefined, details his early life and television career.

Early life and education

Carey was born on May 23, 1958 to Lewis and Beulah Carey. He is the youngest of three brothers (Neil, 1946–2010 and Roger, born 1952) and was raised in the Old Brooklyn neighborhood of Cleveland, Ohio. When Drew was eight years old, his father died from a heart attack. Drew played the cornet and trumpet in the marching band of James Ford Rhodes High School from which he graduated in 1975.

Carey continued on to college at Kent State University (KSU) and was a part of Delta Tau Delta Fraternity. He was expelled twice for poor academic performance and left KSU after three years. Upon leaving the university, Carey enlisted into the United States Marine Corps Reserve in 1980 and served for six years as a field radio operator in the 25th Marine Regiment in Ohio. He moved to Las Vegas for a few months in 1983 and for a short time worked as a bank teller and a waiter at Denny's.

Career

Stand-up career
In 1985, Carey began his comedy career by following up on a suggestion by David Lawrence (a disc jockey friend who had been paying Carey to write jokes for Lawrence's radio show in Cleveland) to go to the library and check out books on how to write jokes. The following year, after winning an open mic contest, Carey became Master of Ceremonies at the Cleveland Comedy Club. He performed at comedy clubs over the next few years in Cleveland and Los Angeles. Carey's first national exposure was competing in the 1988 Star Search. Carey was working as a stand-up comedian when he appeared on The Tonight Show Starring Johnny Carson in November 1991. His performance that night impressed Carson, who invited Carey to the couch next to his desk; this was considered a rare honor for any comedian. In that same year, Carey joined the 14th Annual Young Comedians Special on HBO and made his first appearance on Late Night with David Letterman. In 1994, Carey wrote his own stand-up comedy special, Drew Carey: Human Cartoon, which aired on Showtime and won a CableACE Award for Best Writing.

Acting career

Early roles
Carey's early stand-up career led to supporting roles on television shows during which he developed the character of a hapless middle-class bachelor. In 1993, Carey had a small role in the film Coneheads as a taxi passenger. In 1994, he co-starred with John Caponera in The Good Life, a short-lived sitcom on NBC. After the show was cancelled, Bruce Helford, a writer on the show, hired Carey as a consultant for the television show Someone Like Me.

The Drew Carey Show
After their stint on Someone Like Me, Carey and Helford developed and produced the storyline for The Drew Carey Show. The sitcom revolved around a fictionalized version of Carey, as he took on the stresses of life and work with his group of childhood friends. The show premiered on September 13, 1995, on ABC. In his autobiography, Carey revealed his frustration with having to deal with censors and being unable to employ the off-color humor common in his stand-up routines. Carey initially earned $60,000 per episode in the first seasons, then renegotiated for $300,000. By the final season, he was earning $750,000 per episode. The show had high ratings for its first few seasons, but declining ratings and increasing production costs (around $3 million per episode) precipitated its cancellation. The program had a total of 233 episodes over its nine-year run and Carey was one of four actors to appear in every episode.

Improv television
While still starring in The Drew Carey Show, Carey began hosting the American version of the improvisational comedy show Whose Line Is It Anyway? in 1998. He would announce the improv cast, direct the games, and usually involve himself in the final game of the episode. The show ran for a total of 220 episodes until cancellation in 2006 (it returned with host Aisha Tyler in 2013). In 1998, the New York Friars' Club made Carey the newest inductee of the group's Comedy Central Roast. His friend Ryan Stiles (who costarred in The Drew Carey Show and Whose Line Is It Anyway?) served as the roastmaster. Carey's income from Whose Line Is It Anyway? and The Drew Carey Show led to his inclusion on the Forbes list of highest-paid entertainers of 1998, at 24th with $45.5 million.

For the WB's 2004–2005 prime time schedule, Carey co-produced and starred in Drew Carey's Green Screen Show, a spin-off of Whose Line Is It Anyway?. It was canceled by the WB, but picked up shortly afterward by Comedy Central. The show's premise relied on the use of a green screen for some of the actors' improv interaction with each other. Animation on the screen was visible to the live audience and it was also inserted during post-production for the television audience.

In 2011, Carey began hosting a primetime improv show, called Drew Carey's Improv-A-Ganza. It was filmed at the MGM Grand in Las Vegas, Nevada, and first aired on April 11. The show took on the premise of Whose Line? and Drew Carey's Green Screen Show in that it features many of the same performers from both shows and did improv based on audience-provided suggestions.

Improv All-Stars
Carey was one of the founders of the Improv All-Stars, a group of 11 actors who perform in unscripted skits. The group joined Carey in all three of his improv shows, Whose Line Is It Anyway?, Drew Carey's Green Screen Show, and Drew Carey's Improv-A-Ganza, and some members had major roles or guest-starred on The Drew Carey Show. The Improv All-Stars travel on comedy tours performing at comedy clubs throughout the United States.

Game show host

Power of 10
Beginning in 2007, Carey began hosting game shows, beginning with his April selection as host of the CBS game show pilot Power of 10. The show ran from August 7, 2007 to January 23, 2008, and aired twice weekly during the late summer and early fall. Each game featured contestants predicting how a cross-section of Americans responded to questions covering a wide variety of topics in polls conducted by CBS.

The Price Is Right

After taping the pilot episode for Power of 10, Carey was contacted by CBS about replacing Bob Barker who had earlier announced his own retirement as host of The Price Is Right. After initially turning down the offer, Carey announced on Late Show with David Letterman that he would succeed Barker as host of the program beginning in the fall of 2007. Carey's first episode of The Price Is Right was taped on August 15, 2007, and his shows began airing on October 15, 2007. In response to replacing Barker as host of the game show, Carey stated, "You can't replace Bob Barker. I don't compare myself to anybody... It's only about what you're doing and supposed to do, and I feel like I'm supposed to be doing this." When Carey began hosting, the set, theme music, and show logo were updated. Carey has retained the application of Barker's closing comment about spaying and neutering pets. In 2022, Carey celebrated his fifteenth anniversary as host of the show.

Other roles and appearances

Carey began appearing in commercials for restaurants in the late 1990s in Canada with The Great Root Bear, but his two-year contract with A&W Food Services of Canada was cut short in November 1998 after an episode of The Drew Carey Show featured McDonald's. As a result of his dismissal, Carey sued A&W for compensation.

Disney's Hollywood Studios (then "Disney-MGM Studios"), part of Walt Disney World Resort in Florida, debuted a 12-minute attraction in 1999 titled Sounds Dangerous!. In the show, a camera follows Carey through a day as an undercover detective. When his video camera fails, the audience is left in complete darkness wearing earphones following his adventure through sound cues. The attraction is now closed.

In 2000, Carey was given a cameo appearance in the House Party expansion pack of the computer game The Sims. To make him appear, the characters in the game must throw a successful party, which causes Carey to arrive in a limo and join the festivities. Carey is a fan of The Sims series and during one April Fool's episode of The Drew Carey Show a scene takes place completely within The Sims. Carey made several other cameo appearances in music videos, including "Weird Al" Yankovic's 1999 video for "It's All About the Pentiums" and Fountains of Wayne's 2004 video for "Mexican Wine", giving an introduction to the video as if it were on a stage.

On January 21, 2001, Carey entered as Vince McMahon's guest entrant in the Royal Rumble match.

Although primarily known for his television work, Carey has done limited film work with his first appearance in 1993's Coneheads. His next film was the 2000 television film Geppetto which debuted on The Wonderful World of Disney. The film, an adaptation of Pinocchio, included actor Wayne Brady who had joined Carey on his improv shows. Carey took singing lessons to prepare for the role. In 2005, Carey appeared in three films: the animated film Robots where he provided a voice-over for the character Crank; The Aristocrats where he retold a dirty joke along with other celebrities; and the documentary Fuck where he was interviewed.

Carey provided the entertainment for the 2002 Annual White House correspondents' dinner. Once Carey completed his stand-up routine for the 1,800 guests, President George W. Bush, noting Carey's improv work, made a joke of his own: "Drew? Got any interest in the Middle East?" In 2003, he joined Jamie Kennedy to host the WB's live special Play for a Billion. In September 2003, Carey led a group of comedians, including Blake Clark and The Drew Carey Show's Kathy Kinney, on a comedy tour of Iraq.

On June 8, 2006, Drew Carey's Sporting Adventures debuted on the Travel Channel. In this series, Carey traveled throughout Germany to photograph multiple FIFA World Cup soccer games while he immerses himself in the culture of the towns and states he visits. In early 2008, Carey appeared in Matt Groening's The Simpsons as part of the episode "All About Lisa" as a guest on the Krusty the Clown Show. He also surfaced in the second season of Community playing a well-liked former boss to Jeff Winger.

On March 4, 2014, it was announced on Good Morning America that Carey would compete on the season 18 of Dancing with the Stars. He was partnered with professional dancer Cheryl Burke. They were eliminated during the sixth week of the competition, finishing in 8th place.

Carey has also been a longtime host on SiriusXM channel, Little Steven's Underground Garage (Ch. 21) where for 10 years he hosted a three-hour radio show called "Drew Carey's Friday Night Dance Party" which aired the last Friday of every month. In August 2018, Carey turned his monthly show into a weekly show called "The Friday Night Freak Out" which airs every Friday from 8:00pm to 11:00pm ET on SiriusXM.

In 2018, Carey appeared in an episode of NCIS as a retired Marine. His character was a sergeant, the last rank he held in real life. Real pictures of him in dress blues and everyday garb were on the plasma screen in the squad room.

In 2020, Carey appeared as a contestant on the third season of The Masked Singer as "Llama". He was the second to be eliminated.

In 2021, Carey participated in Celebrity Wheel of Fortune alongside Teri Hatcher and Chrissy Metz. He beat his fellow competitors in the first bonus round, but failed to solve the final bonus round puzzle.

Writing
Carey has routinely written throughout his career. He wrote his own material in his early stand-up career before writing sitcoms. In 1997, Carey published his autobiography, Dirty Jokes and Beer: Stories of the Unrefined, wherein he shared memories of his early childhood and of his father's death when he was eight. He also revealed that he was once molested, had suffered bouts of depression, and had made two suicide attempts by swallowing a large number of sleeping pills. The book discusses his college fraternity years while attending Kent State University and his professional career up to that time. The book featured large amounts of profanity and, as the title suggests, includes multiple dirty jokes (there is one at the start of each chapter) and references to beer. The book was featured on The New York Times bestseller list for three months.

Photography

Carey can sometimes be seen on the sidelines of U.S. National Team soccer games as a press photographer. His images are sold via wire services under the pseudonym Brooks Parkenridge. He was at the 2006 FIFA World Cup in the summer of 2006, for his television show Drew Carey's Sporting Adventures.

Personal life
Carey adopted his crew cut hairstyle while serving in the United States Marine Corps. He underwent refractive surgery to correct his vision and, for a time, did not require glasses, but continued to wear them for purposes of recognition and celebrity identity. On May 17, 2006 episode of Jimmy Kimmel Live!, Carey revealed that when he turned 40, he developed a need for bifocals. 

As of 2007, Carey resides in Los Angeles and New York City.

Carey proposed to Nicole Jaracz in 2007 and is a father figure to Connor, her son from a previous relationship. The couple did not wed and called off their engagement in 2012. 

In January 2018, Carey announced his engagement to sex therapist Amie Harwick. They ended their engagement that November but remained close. On February 15, 2020, Harwick was found dead in a Hollywood Hills neighborhood and her ex-boyfriend was subsequently arrested on suspicion of her murder.

Carey is a Buddhist.

Health
After suffering chest pains while filming The Drew Carey Show in August 2001, Carey underwent a coronary angioplasty.

Although his weight was a comedic topic throughout his sitcom and improv shows, Carey began a diet and exercise plan in 2010 and lost considerable weight, which he also claimed had cured his Type 2 diabetes. He had cataract surgery in 2020.

Political views
Carey is an outspoken Libertarian. He said: 

Carey expressed his distaste for the Bush administration's management of the Iraq War, specifically on the September 14, 2007, episode of Real Time with Bill Maher. He made donations to Ron Paul's presidential campaign for the 2008 election. On the September 26, 2008, episode of The Late Late Show with Craig Ferguson, Carey defined "libertarian" to host Craig Ferguson as "a conservative who still gets high." In 2016, he supported Libertarian Party presidential candidate Gary Johnson in his run for office, and was made an Honorary Chair of the campaign for California.

Carey has voiced his political beliefs in several interviews, and in 1998, led a "smoke-in" in defiance of California's newly passed no-smoking ordinance inside bars and restaurants. He has hosted a series of mini-documentaries, The Drew Carey Project, on Reason.tv, an online project of Reason Foundation, a libertarian-oriented nonprofit think tank on whose board of trustees he sits. The first episode, "Gridlock", addresses private highway ownership and was released on October 15, 2007. Other episodes discuss topics such as eminent domain, urban traffic congestion, and medical marijuana.

Carey endorsed and donated money to Joe Biden in the 2020 United States Presidential Election. Earlier in the cycle, he also donated to Tulsi Gabbard and Bill Weld.

Sports involvement
Carey is a devoted fan of the U.S. National Soccer Team, Cleveland Browns, Cleveland Cavaliers, Cleveland Guardians, and Columbus Blue Jackets. In 1999, he was part of the pregame ceremonies at the first game of the return of the Browns, televised on ESPN. Carey attended the 2006 FIFA World Cup in Germany and the 2010 FIFA World Cup in South Africa. Carey is a minority owner of the Seattle Sounders FC who began to play in Major League Soccer on March 19, 2009 and won two MLS Cups (2016, 2019). Carey is a fan of FC Barcelona and was a season ticket holder for the Los Angeles Galaxy in 2006.

Carey has shown his support for the Cleveland baseball team by throwing the first pitch at an August 12, 2006 game against the Kansas City Royals. He was rewarded by them for being "the greatest Indians fan alive" with a personal bobblehead doll made in his likeness that was given to fans. Carey responded to his bobblehead likeness by saying "Bobblehead Day, for me, is as big as getting a star on the Hollywood Walk of Fame."

In 2001, Carey was the first television actor to enter World Wrestling Federation's 30-man "Royal Rumble" match, which he did to promote an improv comedy pay-per-view at the time. He appeared in a few backstage segments before his brief participation in the match. Upon entering the ring, Carey stood unopposed for more than half a minute, but after the next entrant, Kane, refused a monetary bribe, Carey eliminated himself from the match by jumping over the top rope and retreating from ringside. On April 2, 2011, Carey was inducted into the WWE Hall of Fame by Kane.

Carey competed against five other celebrities in the first celebrity edition of the 2003 World Poker Tour. He placed fifth, beating the only other actor, Jack Black. Carey won $2,000 for his charity.

On May 15, 2011, Carey completed the Marine Corps Historic Half Marathon in 1:57:02; then, on September 4, 2011, he completed the Disneyland Half Marathon in 1:50:46. On October 30, 2011, Carey finished the Marine Corps Marathon with a chip time of 4:37:11, placing 10,149th out of 20,940.

Philanthropy
Carey is a supporter of libraries crediting them for beginning his successful comedy career. On May 2, 2000, in a celebrity edition of Who Wants to Be a Millionaire, Carey selected the Ohio Library Foundation to receive his $500,000 winnings. He later went on to win an additional $32,000 on the second celebrity Millionaire, making him one of the biggest winning contestants on Millionaire who did not win the top prize. Carey also has played on the World Poker Tour in the Hollywood Home games for the Cleveland Public Library charity. In June 2007, he offered to donate up to $100,000 (in $10,000 increments) to the Mooch Myernick Memorial Fund if anybody could beat him at the video game FIFA Soccer 07 for the Xbox 360. Carey dared five players from both the U.S. Men's and Women's National Teams to compete against him. He ended up donating $100,000, plus $60,000 for losing two games out of the six he played.

In October 2009, Carey made a bid of $25,000 in a charity auction for the @drew Twitter account. He later increased his offer to $100,000 if the number of followers of his account @DrewFromTV reached 100,000 by the end of the auction. In an interview with CBS News, he said he would instead donate $1 million to the charity Livestrong Foundation if his follower count reached one million by December 31, 2009.

In September 2014, Carey promised $10,000 to help find the perpetrators of a faked "ice bucket challenge" involving an autistic 14-year-old Ohio boy who, instead of being doused in ice cubes and water, received a shower of feces, urine, tobacco spit, and cigarette butts. Shortly thereafter, celebrities Donnie Wahlberg, Jenny McCarthy and Montel Williams matched Carey's offer. Several teens were eventually charged and admitted to the prank, though they denied that there were feces in the bucket or that they knew the victim was diagnosed with autism.

Filmography
Carey has starred in only a few television shows and films but has made numerous guest-star appearances in a variety of sitcoms and comedy shows.

Film

Television

Awards and honors

 1994: Cable Ace Award for Best Writing: Drew Carey: Human Cartoon
 1995: TV Guide "10 Hottest New Faces of 1995"
 1998: Satellite Award for Best Actor – Musical or Comedy Series
 2000: Honorary DHL from Cleveland State University
 2000: People's Choice Award for Favorite Male Television Performer
 2003: Star on the Hollywood Walk of Fame
 2004:  Comedy Central's 100 Greatest Stand-Ups of All Time (#84)
 2011: Southern California Journalism "Best Advocacy Journalism" Award winner
 2011: WWE Hall of Fame

 Two-time MLS Cup champion (as co-owner of the Seattle Sounders FC - 2016, 2019)
 2021: United States Navy Memorial Foundation Lone Sailor Award (presented on the July 2, 2021 episode of The Price is Right)

References

External links

 
 Drew Carey's blog
 
 
 Drew Carey's WWE Hall of Fame Profile
 

1958 births
Living people
20th-century American comedians
20th-century American male actors
21st-century American comedians
21st-century American male actors
21st-century Buddhists
American Buddhists
American game show hosts
American libertarians
American male comedians
American male film actors
American male singers
American male television actors
American photographers
American soccer chairmen and investors
American stand-up comedians
Comedians from Ohio
Kent State University alumni
Major League Soccer executives
Major League Soccer owners
Male actors from Cleveland
The Price Is Right
United States Marine Corps non-commissioned officers
United States Marine Corps reservists
WWE Hall of Fame inductees